Alt Variety was a New York City-based monthly publication dealing with alternative and subversive themes that launched online in February 2012 and closed in July 2013. Its founder was Luke H. Walker, who ran the magazine under the pseudonym Lee Wong. The magazine was inspired by early internet Usenet groups, which were obscure and largely unregulated newsgroups masked by arcane prefixes (e.g. alt.) used in place of World Wide Web prefix (www). The alt. prefixed Usenets were frequently used to disseminate subversive, illicit and sometimes criminal themes and content. The alt prefix in Alt Variety Magazine was subtle nod to Usenet with bold and frequently offensive content, and anti-censorship agenda.

History 
Alt Variety was launched in February 2012, first as an online magazine and then via an iTunes app. In March 2013, it published a print form, ceasing publication of all forms of the magazine in July of that year.

Marc Jacobs 
In May 2013, Robert Duffy, president and co-founder of Marc Jacobs (MJ), having followed and been a fan of the magazine, proposed to Walker that Alt Variety be distributed at Marc Jacobs retails stores worldwide. Walker agreed, and an initial shipment of 20,000 issues was sent to MJ headquarters in New York City that month. After receiving the magazines, legal representatives from MJ did a content review of current and past issues, and strongly urged Duffy not to move forward with the distribution deal due to the extreme and offensive, uncensored nature of the stories and images. Duffy heeded the advice of his legal team, and the magazines were never shipped to stores.

Editorial content 

Alt Variety published celebrity interviews, advocated fringe culture, the arts and First Amendment rights and covered themes such as recreational drug use and pornography. During its short tenure, Alt Variety published several notable exclusives with prominent counter culture figures such as Tommy Chong, film director Abel Ferrara, Ted McIlvenna (founder Institute for Advanced Study of Human Sexuality), and "Death Rapper" Necro, to name a few. In the wake of the Sandyhook school shooting, Alt Variety published a gun issue that featured a pro-second amendment interview with Bobcat Goldthwait, who had recently released his provocative shooting spree comedy film, God Bless America. Celebrity photographer Robyn Von Swan k contributed exclusive cover story photography to the same issue. The same issue featured a gun, cheese and narcotic pairing chart. For its third issue, Alt Variety published a controversial race issue featuring an exclusive interview with David Duke in which Duke was pressed on his sentiments about then president Barack Obama. The same issue saw a post card addressed to the magazine from Charles Manson, sent from Corcoran State Prison, with a cryptic hand-written message to the editor, an interview with Charles Sampson, the world's first Black rodeo star, and a male escort centerfold.

Distinct Variety
In addition to publishing alternative news and entertainment, altvariety.com also hosted an alternative social media platform called Distinct Variety, which was a spin-off of Walker's defunct website, uglypervert.com; an online community for uncensored fringe art.

Alt Marketplace
Alt Variety was initially envisioned to launch with a Dark Web portal incorporated directly into the website interface of altvariety.com by employing a tor emulator to encrypt user data via the surface web. The concept was discussed with Silk Road marketplace founder Ross Ulbritch, but Ulbritch, perhaps fortuitously, declined partnering with Alt Variety. In lieu of a dark web portal, Alt Variety instead launched with a craigslist-like surface web community marketplace called the alt marketplace. Despite being heavily clad with disclaimers and warnings to its users the alt marketplace became a pre Backpage outlet for illicit posts

Post magazine 
In 2013, subsequent to the collapse of Alt Variety Magazine, began the slow emergence of multimedia production spin off Alt Variety Media. Since 2017, Alt Variety Media has functioned largely as a not-for-profit community arts entity, producing a number of low budget music videos and social media content aimed at nurturing emerging artists. In 2021, Alt Variety rebranded as a full-service film production company, based in Hollywood, CA.

Theater and feature film 
Alt Variety’s most notable project to date was the theater and film adaptations of the play, The Wake of Dick Johnson.

Fundraising for Coney Island parade 
In the wake of Hurricane Sandy, which devastated Coney Island, Alt Variety was responsible for organizing, curating, and hosting a concert benefit for the Coney Island Mermaid Parade at Bowery Ballroom, featuring headliners Amanda Palmer, Mina Caputo, and Abel Ferrara. Alt Variety also enlisted Judah Friedlander to help raise public awareness about the imperiled parade after founder and editor in chief Lee Wong asked the comedian to create a service announcement to solicit donations.

References

Alternative magazines
Monthly magazines published in the United States
Online magazines published in the United States
Celebrity magazines published in the United States
Defunct magazines published in the United States
English-language magazines
Magazines established in 2012
Magazines disestablished in 2013
Magazines published in New York City